Moonnamathoral is a 2006 Indian Malayalam-language supernatural film directed by V. K. Prakash and written by Rajesh Jayaraman. It stars Jayaram, Vineeth, Samvrutha Sunil, Sherin Shringar, and Jyothirmayi.

The film was the first Malayalam film to be digitally distributed to theatres via satellite. It was also the first Malayalam film to be shot entirely using high-definition (HD) cameras. The film was released on 18 August 2006.

Plot
Two young girls, Anupama and Rahael, rent an old palace and are disturbed by the presence of a strange lady who moves around their place. They are adamant on finding out the truth about her. The palace's manager, also a witchcraft practitioner, is keen to help them. As the girls find it difficult to move forward in their enquiry, the second story begins.

The second story follows when Jeeva, a police officer, falls in love with Bala, who is a budding writer. Their professions intervene with their personal lives, preventing them from any serious romancing prior to marriage. Soon after their marriage, Jeeva receives a job transfer to the high ranges of Idukki. Bala is excited at the prospect, as she feels the salubrious mountain atmosphere will help nurture her writing skills. Jeeva is also looking forward to it, as a perfect opportunity to rekindle their lost romance.

However, despite the positive atmosphere, life at the bungalow soon takes an unexpected twist. Life for the couple turns uneasy, as Bala senses someone, apart from the two of them, inhabiting the bungalow. Haunted by a perpetual paranoia, she wakes up most nights to nightmares. Jeeva, concerned with how their marriage is turning out, finally agrees to investigate. The investigation leads him into the unknown realms of the bungalow's shady past, unravelling a forgotten history, thus leading to a startling realisation of who the "third someone" is.

Cast
Jayaram as C.I Jeevan
Jyothirmai as Bala
Vineeth as Dr. Arun
Sherin Shringar as Rahael
Samvrutha Sunil as Anupama
Murali Menon as Vijayan Menon
Harisree Ashokan
Mala Aravindan
Prem Prakash
Kunjan
Ashraf
Kulappulli Leela 
Maya Viswanath

Production
The new technology was developed by Mumbai-based DG2L Technologies. The digital technology used for the film was provided in Kerala by Emil & Eric Digital Private Limited, a Thrissur-based company. The film was shot primarily at Peerumedu in Idukki.

Soundtrack

Release
Nearly 80 theatres across Kerala were equipped with digital transponders to receive the film via satellite.

Reception
A critic noted that "V.K. Prakash manages to maintain the tempo of the film and gets the aid of visual and sound effects to maintain the horror effect throughout". Another critic opined that "The highlight of the film is Lokanathan's camera which commenced its terrifying journey and the audio track which assumed a menacing pitch".

See also 
 List of Malayalam horror films

References

External links
 

Indian horror thriller films
2006 films
2000s Malayalam-language films
Films scored by Ouseppachan
Films directed by V. K. Prakash